The following squads and players competed in the women's handball tournament at the 1988 Summer Olympics.

China
The following players represented China:

 Chen Zhen
 Dai Jianfen
 He Jianping
 Li Jie
 Li Lirong
 Lu Guanghong
 Sun Xiulan
 Wang Mingxing
 Wang Tao
 Xue Jinhua
 Zhang Hong
 Zhang Weihong

Czechoslovakia
The following players represented Czechoslovakia:

 Alena Damitšová
 Anna Hradská
 Božena Mažgutová
 Daniela Trandžíková-Nováková
 Gabriela Sabadošová
 Irena Tomašovičová
 Jana Stašová
 Júlia Kolečániová
 Lenka Pospíšilová
 Mária Ďurišinová
 Marie Šmídová
 Marta Pösová
 Monika Hejtmánková
 Petra Lupačová
 Zuzana Budayová

Ivory Coast
The following players represented the Ivory Coast:

 Adjoua N'Dri
 Alimata Douamba
 Brigitte Guigui
 Clementine Blé
 Dounbia Bah
 Elisabeth Kouassi
 Emilie Djoman
 Gouna Irie
 Hortense Konan
 Julienne Vodoungbo
 Koko Elleingand
 Mahoula Kramou
 Wandou Guehi
 Zomou Awa

Norway
The following players represented Norway:

 Kjerstin Andersen
 Berit Digre
 Marte Eliasson
 Susann Goksør
 Trine Haltvik
 Hanne Hegh
 Hanne Hogness
 Vibeke Johnsen
 Kristin Midthun
 Karin Pettersen
 Karin Singstad
 Annette Skotvoll
 Ingrid Steen
 Heidi Sundal
 Cathrine Svendsen

South Korea
The following players represented South Korea:

 Han Hyun-sook
 Ki Mi-sook
 Kim Choon-rye
 Kim Hyun-mee
 Kim Kyung-soon
 Kim Myung-soon
 Lee Ki-soon
 Lim Mi-kyung
 Shon Mi-Na
 Song Ji-hyun
 Suk Min-hee
 Sung Kyung-hwa

Soviet Union
The following players represented the Soviet Union:

 Natalya Anisimova
 Maryna Bazhanova
 Tatyana Dzhandzhgava
 Elina Guseva
 Tetyana Horb
 Larysa Karlova
 Natalya Lapitskaya
 Svitlana Mankova
 Nataliya Matryuk
 Natalya Morskova
 Olena Nemashkalo
 Nataliya Rusnachenko
 Olha Semenova
 Yevheniya Tovstohan
 Zinaida Turchyna

United States
The following players represented the United States:

 Kathy Callaghan
 Kim Clarke
 Laura Coenen
 Sandra DeLaRiva
 Megan Gallagher
 Amy Gamble
 Sam Jones
 Portia Lack
 Karyn Palgut
 Carol Peterka
 Angie Raynor
 Cindy Stinger
 Penny Stone
 Sherry Winn

Yugoslavia
The following players represented Yugoslavia:

 Desanka Stojanović
 Dragana Pešić
 Dragica Đurić
 Ljiljana Marković
 Ljiljana Mugoša
 Ljubinka Janković
 Mirjana Đurica
 Mirjana Krstić
 Nataša Kolega
 Slavica Djukić
 Slavica Rinčić
 Svetlana Mičić
 Svetlana Mugoša-Antić
 Svetlana Anastasovski-Obućina
 Zita Galic

References

1988